Babe the Blue OX (BOX)  are an American, Brooklyn-based rock band. Formed in 1991, the trio was initially composed of Tim Thomas (guitar, vocals), Rose Thomson (bass, vocals) and Hanna Fox (drums, vocals). in 1995, the band contributed the song "Hazmats" to the AIDS benefit album Red Hot + Bothered produced by the Red Hot Organization.  Fox's husband Eddie Gormley was formally added as 2nd drummer in 1998, and the band continues to play a handful of shows a year. In 2010, they were a headline act at the Cincinnati Mid-Point Music Festival.

The group's music touches on various styles, but always emphasizes melodic if quirky songwriting. Everything from noisy no wave to '80's new wave, classic rock to funk, math rock to melancholic pop gets a nod on each of their releases. Their early albums were released but indie labels, after which they signed a two-album deal with major label RCA. Subsequently they continue to write music collaboratively in "the basement focused primarily on the joy of making stuff," according to Thomas.

Over the past ten years, each member has recorded and performed music with other projects. Thomson writes, sings and plays with The Walking Hellos; Thomas helms Noblesse Oblige and records under the name Timothy James Thomas; Gormley and Fox create music as Vatican III.

In February, 2013, the band released its first album in 15 years, Guilty.

Trivia

With the exception of their debut, the titles of their albums have thus far been deliberate adaptations of titles of Barbra Streisand albums. The significance of this is unclear.
Thomas hosted the first ever edition of The Buzz Bin Report on MTV in 1990, introducing American audience to EMF and their hit "Unbelievable".
For their "second acts," Fox is a lawyer, Gormley an architect, Thomas a non-profit fundraiser and Thomson a financial planner and accountant - a self-described one-stop shop for "all your middle-aged needs." A new album is planned for sometime in the next decade.
Thomson is the featured voice on the soundtrack to the first Scream movie. Thomson was asked by composer Marco Beltrami to sing spookily.

Discography
"There's Always Room for One More, Honey" (single) Stamp Records
"Chicken Head Bone Sucker" (single) 1992
Box, 1993 Homestead Records
Je m'Appelle Babe (EP) 1993 Positive Records
Track "The Lady Is a Tramp" on the Frank Sinatra tribute album Chairman of the Board (although it listed as the fifth, it was the fourth - the list mistakenly switched position with the next Indian Bingo track which is really the fifth)
Color Me Babe, 1994 Positive Records
People, 1996 RCA Records
The Way We Were, 1998 RCA Records
Guilty, 2013 Guilty Records

External links
 Babe the blue OX bandcamp page

Noblesse Oblige
Walking Hellos
Timothy James Thomas

Musical groups from New York (state)
Homestead Records artists